Kotlyar or Kotliar is an East Slavic language occupational surname, with котляр literally meaning "boilermaker". Notable people with this surname include:

Anton Kotlyar
Gabriel Kotliar
Nadiia Kotliar
Nikolai Kotlyar 

East Slavic-language surnames
Occupational surnames